The Garha Kingdom, also called Garha Mandla or Garha Katanga was part of the northern portion of Gondwana.

History
The first Gond king of Garha-Mandla was Jadurai. He became king after deposing the Kalchuri Rajputs of Garha-Mandla, where earlier he worked in court.

The Garha-Mandla kingdom was earlier a small territory which witnessed rapid expansion under the rule of Sangram Shah, the 48th king, He captured territories like Narmada Valley, Bhopal, Sagar, Damoh and most of the Satpura hills. He conquered 52 forts called Garh to strengthen and spread the Gond territory. The Chouragrh Fort in Narsinghpur was built in the honour of conquering 52 forts. Sangram Shah is best known as a patron of arts and literature and he had great knowledge of Sanskrit. Rasratnamala was written by Sangram Shah. At the time of Sangram Shah the capital of Garha kingdom was Singhorgarh.

His successor Dalpat Shah, was married to Rani Durgawati who was a Chandela Rajput princess. Rani Durgavati moved her capital to Chouragarh because it was safer than Singhorgarh. Rani Durgawati made the kingdom extremely prosperous, it was said that the people paid their taxes in gold in her reign. She battled against Mughal Emperor Akbar's forces lead by Asaf Khan I in 1564. Though she lost, she is remembered as a war-heroine and is still praised in the areas of the former Garha kingdom. The Mughals acquired immense booty, including thousands of elephants from this victory.  

After 25 years of Mughal rule, the kingdom was restored to Chandra Shah, another son of Sangram Shah and half-brother of Dalpat Shah. He was recognized as the successor of Rani Durgavati by Akbar on accepting Mughal suzerainty and ceding 10 of the garhas.
He was followed in succession by Madhukar Shah and Prem Narain. Jhujhar Singh of Orchha assassinated Prem Narain, however, Mughal interference restored the kingdom to Hridayshah.

Hridayshah maintained friendly relations with the Mughals, he spent days at the imperial court in Delhi as well. He moved his capital from Chouragarh to Ramnagar of Mandla district.

Decline
Hriday Shah was the last great king of Garha-Mandla. After his death, no great ruler appeared and court intrigue was common, greatly weakening the state. It ceded away portions of its territory and its revenues were spent to buy off its enemies. One of its feudatories, the Gond rajas of Deogadh, took advantage of the kingdom's weakness subsequent to the temporary Mughal conquest in the early 17th century and annexed a large part of its territories. Bakht Buland Shah, the Gond raja of Deogarh, was ceded the district of Seoni, Chauri, Dongartal and Ghansour by Narendra Shah of Mandla for his aid against the rebellious Pathan jagirdars in the kingdom.

By the time of Maharaj Shah (1732-1742), the kingdom held only 29 out of the initial 52 forts held by his ancestor Sangram Shah. In 1742, Peshwa Balaji Baji Rao attacked Garh-Mandla along with Visaji Chandorkar, leader of the Sagar Marathas and killed the ruler, Maharaj Shah. His son, Shivraj Singh, ascended he throne on the condition that he would pay an annual tribute of 4 lakhs to the Marathas. Garha-Mandla essentially became a dependent state of the Sagar Marathas.

In 1780, Narhar Shah of Mandla was defeated by the Maratha king of Nagpur, Mudhoji Bhonsle and annexed the territories now constituting Balaghat District and some part of Bhandara District. Narhar Shah's kingdom was finally annexed in 1781 by the Sagar Marathas and he was sent to spend the rest of his days at Khurai fort in Saugor. The anthropologist Stephen Fuchs describes- "In 1781 the last Gond ruler of Mandla, Narhar Shah, was tortured to death by the Maratha general Moraji, and Mandla became a dependency of the Saugor Marathas. In 1799 Mandla fell to the Bhonsla king of Nagpur, till in 1818 the British took over and assumed the rule also over Mandla."

Aftermath
In 1817, Mandla came under British rule during the Third Anglo-Maratha War.
Shankar Shah, a pensioner of the British, descendent of the rajas of Garha-Mandla and his son Raghunath Shah were arrested of a plot to murder the English residents of Jabalpur during the Revolt of 1857 and were executed by blowing from a gun in Jabalpur.

Emblem of Gondwana State
For over a millennium in South Asia, the visual trope of a triumphant lion vanquishing one or several elephants has been common in architectural sculpture, both in the round and in relief. In the rather limited scholarship on this motif, diverse interpretations have been offered. Although its presence has remained fairly stable through time, there exist many minor variations on this motif, including the use of leonine creatures variously described as vyālas or yālīs, and the incorporation of other fantastic creatures known popularly as makaras in such combats. In South India, the myth of the fantastic composite animal called the Śarabha takes this imagery yet further. Yet, the simple image of a lion victorious over one or more elephants was situated very strategically within certain architectural programs for given periods and places. For example, Gondwana Kingdom forts, Deccani forts constructed between the fifteenth and seventeenth centuries carried this representation on their barbicans and gateways . While tracing the history of this visual motif.

Administration
Administration of Gondwana was becoming centralised. The kingdom was divided into garh, each garh was controlled by particular Gond clan. This was further divided into units of 84 villages called chourasi. The chourasi was further subdivided into barhots which are made up of 12 villages each.

53 Garh of Gondwana

List of Rulers

Independent rulers  
 Kharji (1440-1460)
 Gorakshakdas (1460-1480) 
 Sukhandar (1480-1500)
 Arjun Das (1500-1513)
 Sangram Shah also known as Aman das (1513-1543)
 Dalpat Shah (1543-1550)
 Rani Durgawati (1550-1564)
 Chandra Shah (1589 -?)
 Madhukar Shah
 Prem Narain
 Hridayshah (1634-1668)
 Chhatra Shah (1668-1685)
 Kesari Shah (1685-1688) 
 Narendra Shah (1688-1732)
 Maharaj Shah (1732-1742)
 Shivraj Shah (1742-1749)
 Durjan Shah (1749)
 Nizam Shah (1749-1776)
 Narhar Shah (1776-1781)

References

https://thewire.in/rights/adivasi-religion-recognition-census

Ancient empires and kingdoms of India